Anna Elżbieta Sobecka (born 27 March 1951 in Piotrków Kujawski) is a Polish Member of Parliament. She was elected to the Sejm on 25 September 2005, getting 13,761 votes in 5 Toruń district as a candidate on the League of Polish Families list. Currently she is a Law and Justice party member. She regularly appears on Radio Maryja and Telewizja Trwam.

She was also a member of The Polish Sejm from 1997 to 2019 when she failed to get re-elected.

She gained some fame in Poland for her quote "Sex is bad as it doesn't develop the mankind". Sobacka is also a vigorous opponent of legalizing same-sex unions. She claims homosexuality is an illness and homosexuals are sick people, and that homosexual orientation is caused by "lack of love during childhood".

See also
Members of Polish Sejm 2005–2007

References

External links
Anna Sobecka - parliamentary page - includes declarations of interest, voting record, and transcripts of speeches.

1951 births
Living people
People from Radziejów County
Members of the Polish Sejm 2005–2007
Members of the Polish Sejm 1997–2001
Members of the Polish Sejm 2001–2005
Women members of the Sejm of the Republic of Poland
League of Polish Families politicians
20th-century Polish women politicians
21st-century Polish women politicians
Members of the Polish Sejm 2007–2011
Members of the Polish Sejm 2011–2015